Great Beds Light is a sparkplug lighthouse in Raritan Bay, about  from South Amboy of Middlesex County, New Jersey, United States. Over the years the lighthouse has become the symbol for the city of South Amboy. Named as Great Beds Light Station, it was added to the National Register of Historic Places on May 29, 2008, for its significance in architecture, engineering, transportation, and maritime history.

History and description

The light was built in 1880 with a fourth order Fresnel lens to mark the Great Beds Shoal, hazardous shallow water in the Raritan Bay.

Lighthouses of Raritan Bay
Chapel Hill Rear Range Light, Sandy Hook Bay (deactivated 1957)
Conover Beacon, Leonardo
Navesink Twin Lights, Highlands
Sandy Hook Lighthouse, Sandy Hook

See also
 National Register of Historic Places listings in Middlesex County, New Jersey
List of the oldest buildings in New Jersey
Geography of New York-New Jersey Harbor Estuary
Raritan Bayshore

References

Lighthouses completed in 1880
Transportation buildings and structures in Middlesex County, New Jersey
Lighthouses on the National Register of Historic Places in New Jersey
National Register of Historic Places in Middlesex County, New Jersey
South Amboy, New Jersey
New Jersey Register of Historic Places
1880 establishments in New Jersey